"Survivor" is a song recorded by American group Destiny's Child for their third studio album of the same title (2001). It was written and composed by group member Beyoncé, Anthony Dent, and Mathew Knowles.
"Survivor" was inspired by a joke that a radio station had made about the fact that three members had already left the group, comparing the band to the reality game show Survivor. Beyoncé was inspired to take the negative comment and turn it into a positive by writing a song out of it. The song was released as the lead single from Survivor on March 6, 2001, by Columbia Records. It marked the first single released by the trio of Beyoncé, Kelly Rowland, and Michelle Williams.

"Survivor" was a commercial success, peaking at number two on the US Billboard Hot 100 and topping the charts in Ireland, Norway, and the United Kingdom. Critically acclaimed, the song won the Best R&B Performance by a Duo or Group with Vocals at the 44th Annual Grammy Awards (2002). Its accompanying music video won the 2001 MTV Video Music Award for Best R&B Video, while the song also won a Soul Train Lady of Soul Award for Best R&B/Soul Single, Group, Band or Duo. In 2017, Billboard ranked the song at number 40 on their list "100 Greatest Girl Group Songs of All Time". Additionally, BET named it the tenth best song of the 2000s.

Background and development
"Survivor" was written by Anthony Dent, Destiny's Child band member Beyoncé Knowles and her father Mathew, while production was helmed by Dent and Beyoncé. The song addresses the drama the band endured in 2000, when original members LaTavia Roberson and LeToya Luckett split from Knowles and Kelly Rowland, and were replaced by Michelle Williams and Farrah Franklin. Soon afterwards Franklin was also dismissed from the group, leading to more well-publicized personnel changes. According to Knowles, the group was publicly compared to the reality series Survivor, which inspired her to "write us out of all that negativity."

Dent initially envisioned his instrumental track to be recorded by rapper Lil' Kim, before Beyoncé used it to pen the lyrics, melody and vocal arrangement for "Survivor." Much of the song was written during a flight to the next city while Destiny's Child was opening for singer Christina Aguilera during her Christina Aguilera in Concert tour. Knowles later elaborated on the process: "I wrote it quickly because I was frustrated. For me, it was all about what survival means for women, and how hard it is to be one when there are people out there who are trying to bring you down." She further commented on its concept in an interview with MTV in which she stated that "Survivor" was "basically about surviving different situations. Everyone in this world that I know, they've survived something, and I know the song is definitely inspirational. It really makes you feel strong and it really makes you feel like you can survive anything."

Recording of the song took place at the SugarHill Studios in Houston, Texas in late 2000. "Survivor" was the first song from its parent album to be recorded. In a promotional 2001 interview with Billboard, Williams commented on the recording process: "Words can't describe how we felt when we recorded that song. Some of us were crying, others were jumping up and down [...] We prayed before that session, and the energy in that session was so high –— the room was heated." The chanting of the word "what!" in the chorus was Mathew Knowles' contribution to the song and added late into the recording of the "Survivor" after he had walked into the session while the band was recording and felt that a chanting part would suggest audience participation.

Composition
The song is performed in the key of G minor,  with a tempo of 81 beats per minute in common time. In the harmonic minor scale, it follows a chord progression of Gm–Cm–D, and the group's vocals span an octave and a half, from  G3 to C5.

Critical reception
Billboard critic Chuck Taylor noted that "Survivor" was "careful not to stray from the well-established formula that has made Destiny's Child the pop act du jour – a skittish stop- and-start beat, the puissant vocals of co-songwriter/producer Beyoncé Knowles, and a lyric about life in the victory lane when mankind does you wrong." AllMusic editor Stephen Thomas Erlewine found that "Survivor" was "painfully labored, stuttering over a halting melody that Beyoncé Knowles breathlessly pushes to absolutely nowhere, working it so hard that it's difficult to listen."

Commercial performance
"Survivor" debuted at number 43 on the US Billboard Hot 100, making it the group's second highest-debuting single to date, behind "Lose My Breath" at number 30. It quickly ascended through the chart, reaching its peak of number two within a month, remaining at the position for seven consecutive weeks. The song was not released on physical formats until after its airplay had peaked; it topped the Billboard Hot Dance Music Maxi-Singles Sales chart for eight weeks. It also peaked at number five on the Hot R&B/Hip-Hop Songs chart. The single stayed atop the Hot 100 Airplay chart for five consecutive weeks and peaked at number three on the Hot 100 Singles Sales chart. Its DVD edition peaked at number nine on the US Top Music Videos chart.

In the United Kingdom, "Survivor" debuted at number one on the UK Singles Chart, selling 104,000 copies in its first week. It had sold 260,000 copies by the end of 2001, and has sold over 832,000 copies as of April 2021. It also topped the charts in Ireland and the Netherlands, while peaking at number two in Canada and number three in New Zealand.

Music video

An accompanying music video for "Survivor" was directed by Darren Grant and filmed in various locations throughout Los Angeles County, California on January 27–29, 2001. The clip is styled in the sense of three survivors living on an uninhabited island. It also shows a brief prelude to how the trio got shipwrecked. Following their shipwreck, they uncover an island where they change clothes and walk into a waterfall leading to a deserted temple where it transforms into a dance break. It storms on through the dance bridge and the prelude of the shipwreck. After this, a helicopter starts buzzing leading to where the members are racing out of the island for their escape. External shots in the video were filmed at Point Dume State Beach on the on the coast of Malibu as well as the Los Angeles County Arboretum and Botanic Garden in Arcadia, with the rest of the sequences being filmed at the Los Angeles Center Studios.

The final video premiered on MTV's making of docu series Making the Video on March 6, 2001. One of Destiny's Child's "most difficult videos" to film due to the unseasonal weather conditions in California in late January 2001, the band was reportedly "sick for days" after shooting beach scenes in their skimpy outfits. The "Surivor" music video was later released on DVD with a live performance of "Independent Women Part I" at the 2001 Brit Awards on May 15, 2001. The release was a standard full-frame transfer that preserved the original aspect ratio of the video, with an English soundtrack rendered in Dolby Digital Stereo. It was featured on the DualDisc edition of their greatest hits album #1's (2005), on the international edition of Survivor (2001) as an enhanced video, on the Walmart-exclusive DVD titled Fan Pack (2004), and on Destiny's Child Video Anthology (2013). Director Cary Joji Fukunaga got his start in the film industry as a camera production assistant on the video.

Controversy
Former group members LeToya Luckett and LaTavia Roberson filed a lawsuit against Knowles, Rowland, and former manager Mathew Knowles; they claimed some of the lyrics in "Survivor", such as "You thought I wouldn't sell without you/sold nine million", violated a previous agreement that prevented either party from insulting the other.

Track listings

 US and Canadian CD single 
 "Survivor" (remix extended version featuring Da Brat) – 4:24
 "Survivor" (Calderone club mix) – 9:26
 "Survivor" (Calderone Drum Dub mix) – 6:45
 "Survivor" (CB200 Club Anthem mix) – 6:20
 "Survivor" (Azza'z soul remix) – 4:30

 US 7-inch single 
A. "Survivor – 4:14
B. "Survivor" (featuring Da Brat) – 4:24

 US 12-inch single 
A1. "Survivor" (Calderone club mix) – 9:26
A2. "Survivor" (Calderone Drum Dub mix) – 6:45
B1. "Survivor" (CB200 Club Anthem mix) – 6:20
B2. "Survivor" (remix extended version featuring Da Brat) – 4:24
B3. "Survivor" (Azza'z soul remix) – 4:30

 US DVD single 
 "Survivor"
 "Independent Women Part I" (live at The Brits 2001)

 European CD single 
 "Survivor" (album version)
 "Survivor" (Azza'z soul remix radio edit)

 UK CD1 
 "Survivor" (album version) – 4:14
 "Survivor" (Azza'z soul remix radio edit) – 3:56
 "Survivor" (Victor Calderone club mix) – 9:26

 UK CD2 
 "Survivor" (Jaimeson full vocal remix) – 6:19
 "Independent Women Part 1" (live at The Brits 2001) – 3:52
 "So Good" (Maurice's soul remix) – 7:35
 "Independent Women Part 1" (live at The Brits 2001 video version)

 UK cassette single 
 "Survivor" (album version) – 4:14
 "Survivor" (Maurice's Soul Survivor mix) – 7:51

 Australian CD single 
 "Survivor" (album version)
 "So Good" (Maurice's soul remix)
 "So Good" (Digital Black-N-Groove club mix)
 "Independent Women Part I" (Joe Smooth 200 Proof 2 Step Mix)

Credits and personnel
Credits adapted from the liner notes of Survivor.

Rich Balmer – assistant engineer
Kerren Berz – strings
Orlando Calzada – engineer
Anthony Dent – engineer, producer, writer
Beyoncé Knowles – producer, vocals, writer

Mathew Knowles – executive producer, writer
Redd – keyboards
Kelly Rowland – vocals
Brian Springer – engineer
Michelle Williams  – vocals

Charts

Weekly charts

Year-end charts

Certifications

Release history

See also
 List of number-one singles of 2001 (Ireland)
 List of UK Singles Chart number ones of the 2000s
 List of UK R&B Singles Chart number ones of 2001

References

External links
 

2000 songs
2001 singles
Columbia Records singles
Destiny's Child songs
Irish Singles Chart number-one singles
Music videos directed by Darren Grant
Number-one singles in Norway
Song recordings produced by Beyoncé
Songs with feminist themes
Songs written by Anthony Dent
Songs written by Beyoncé
UK Singles Chart number-one singles